Garnet Edward "Ace" Bailey (June 13, 1948 – September 11, 2001) was a Canadian professional ice hockey player and scout who was a member of Stanley Cup and Memorial Cup-winning teams. He died at the age of 53 while aboard United Airlines Flight 175, which crashed into the South Tower of the World Trade Center in New York City during the September 11 attacks.

Career
At the time of his death, Bailey was the Los Angeles Kings' director of pro scouting.

Death and legacy
Bailey died when the plane in which he was traveling, United Airlines Flight 175, was hijacked and deliberately crashed into the South Tower of the World Trade Center in New York City during the September 11 attacks. Bailey and amateur scout Mark Bavis were traveling from Boston to Los Angeles when the flight was hijacked. They had been in Manchester visiting the Los Angeles Kings' AHL affiliate, the Monarchs.

Bailey and Bavis are mentioned in the Boston-based Dropkick Murphys song "Your Spirit's Alive." Denis Leary wore a Bailey memorial T-shirt as the character Tommy Gavin in the season 1 episode "Immortal" and the fourth-season episode "Pussified" in the TV series Rescue Me. In his memory, the Los Angeles Kings named their new mascot "Bailey".

Bailey's family founded the Ace Bailey Children's Foundation in his memory. The foundation raises funds to benefit hospitalized children, infants and their families.

At the National September 11 Memorial, Bailey and Bavis are memorialized at the South Pool, on Panel S-3. On October 14, 2012, the Kings brought the Stanley Cup to the memorial and placed it on panels featuring Bailey and Bavis's names so that the families of Bailey and Bavis could "[have] their day with the Stanley Cup". The Kings' general manager Dean Lombardi was also in attendance.

Career statistics

Regular season and playoffs

Source: NHL.com

References

External links

 
 

1948 births
2001 deaths
Boston Bruins draft picks
Boston Bruins players
Canadian ice hockey left wingers
Canadian terrorism victims
Detroit Red Wings players
Edmonton Oil Kings (WCHL) players
Edmonton Oilers (WHA) players
Edmonton Oilers scouts
Filmed killings
Hershey Bears players
Houston Apollos players
Ice hockey people from Saskatchewan
Los Angeles Kings scouts
Male murder victims
Sportspeople from Lloydminster
People from Lynnfield, Massachusetts
People murdered in New York City
Sportspeople from Essex County, Massachusetts
St. Louis Blues players
Stanley Cup champions
Terrorism deaths in New York (state)
United Airlines Flight 175
Victims of aviation accidents or incidents in the United States
Victims of the September 11 attacks
Washington Capitals players
Wichita Wind players